Virbia laeta, the joyful holomelina, is a moth in the family Erebidae. It was described by Félix Édouard Guérin-Méneville in 1844. It is found in North America from New Brunswick south to Florida and west to Minnesota and south to Texas. The habitat consists of pine woodlands.

The length of the forewings is about 11 mm for males and 17 mm for females. The forewings are fuscous to dark greyish brown with a light salmon band. The hindwings are geranium pink. In Louisiana, adults have been recorded on wing year round (except December). In Texas, there are two generations per year with adults on wing in March and June. In the northern parts of the range, there seems to be one generation per year, with adults on wing in June and July.

Larvae have been reared on dandelion and plantain species.

References

Moths described in 1844
laeta